James Francis Boylen (born April 18, 1965)  is an American basketball coach. Boylen served as head coach for the University of Utah, coaching the program from 2007 to 2011 before being fired on March 12, 2011. The Utah job was his first head coaching position after spending over a decade as an assistant at both the NBA and NCAA levels. He replaced Ray Giacoletti, who was fired from Utah on March 3, 2007. Prior to joining Utah, Boylen spent two years at Michigan State University (MSU) as assistant coach under Tom Izzo.

College career
Boylen was born in East Grand Rapids, Michigan in 1965 and attended the University of Maine, where he was a captain during both his junior and senior seasons. As a senior, he earned First Team All-North Atlantic Conference honors after averaging 21 points per game. That same year, he finished runner-up in the conference Player of the Year voting to Northeastern's Reggie Lewis. Boylen earned a bachelor's degree in business from Maine in 1987.

Coaching history

Early years
Boylen began his coaching career as an assistant under Michigan State head coach Jud Heathcote. He would stay there from 1987 to 1992 before accepting a position with the NBA's Houston Rockets. As an assistant coach with the Rockets, Boylen would help coach the team to win two NBA championships. After his 11-year stint with Houston, Boylen became an assistant coach with the Golden State Warriors and then the Milwaukee Bucks. After 13 years of coaching in the NBA, he returned to Michigan State as an assistant with the Spartans. As Tom Izzo's top assistant, he helped lead Michigan State to a 45–23 record in two years, including two NCAA appearances.

Utah
On March 27, 2007, Boylen was named the head coach at the University of Utah.

In his first season, Boylen brought more consistency to the Utes, guiding them to their first winning record in two years and their first postseason berth since reaching the NCAA tournament in 2005. While there were some struggles, including two losses to BYU for the second consecutive year, Utah did manage to beat instate rival Utah State and earned a surprising victory on the road at Cal. The Utes also stunned New Mexico in the first round of the 2008 Mountain West tournament, all but killing the Lobos' chances of gaining an at-large berth to the NCAA Tournament. Boylen's Utes finished his inaugural season with an 18–15 mark, defeating UTEP in the first round of the 2008 College Basketball Invitational before losing to eventual champion Tulsa.

In his second season, Boylen turned the Utes into Mountain West Conference champions, guiding them to a 21–9 regular season record (12–4 in the Mountain West) and winning the conference tournament. The Utes were then given a fifth seed in the NCAA tournament but were upset by the Arizona squad with two future NBA players (Jordan Hill and Chase Budinger).

After graduating several key players from the 2008–09 team, Utah struggled in Boylen's third season, regressing to a losing record and finishing in the bottom-half of the Mountain West Conference. Their 17 losses marked their second worst total in the last 20 years with only the 2007 Utes having more on the season.

In Boylen's fourth season, the Utes went 13–18. The program fired him on March 12, 2011.

San Antonio Spurs
On June 28, 2013, Boylen was hired by the San Antonio Spurs as an assistant coach for the 2013–14 season. Boylen won his third NBA championship after the Spurs defeated the Miami Heat 4–1 in the 2014 NBA Finals.

On June 2, 2015, Boylen and David Vanterpool were named to Canada men's national basketball team.

Chicago Bulls
On June 17, 2015, Boylen was named associate head coach of the Chicago Bulls. 

On December 3, 2018, the Bulls promoted Boylen to head coach when Fred Hoiberg was relieved of his duties after a 5–19 start to the 2018–19 season.

On August 14, 2020, the Bulls fired Boylen after a 39–84 record in two seasons without a playoff appearance. His .317 winning percentage was the second worst in franchise history (minimum 100 games) behind Tim Floyd (.205).

On October 20, 2021, the USA Basketball announced that Boylen had been selected head coach for USA Basketball World Cup qualifying team to play in November window.

Head coaching record

NBA

|-
| style="text-align:left;"|Chicago
| style="text-align:left;"|
| 58 || 17 || 41 ||  || style="text-align:center;"|5th in Central || — || — || — || —
| style="text-align:center;"|Missed playoffs
|-
| style="text-align:left;"|Chicago
| style="text-align:left;"|
| 65 || 22 || 43 ||  || style="text-align:center;"|3rd in Central || — || — || — || —
| style="text-align:center;"|Missed playoffs
|-class="sortbottom"
| style="text-align:center;" colspan="2"|Career
| 123 || 39 || 84 ||  ||   || — || — || — || — ||

References

External links
 University of Utah bio
 College playing statistics

1965 births
Living people
American men's basketball coaches
American men's basketball players
Basketball coaches from Michigan
Basketball players from Michigan
Chicago Bulls assistant coaches
Chicago Bulls head coaches
College men's basketball head coaches in the United States
Golden State Warriors assistant coaches
Houston Rockets assistant coaches
Indiana Pacers assistant coaches
Maine Black Bears men's basketball players
Michigan State Spartans men's basketball coaches
Milwaukee Bucks assistant coaches
People from East Grand Rapids, Michigan
Utah Utes men's basketball coaches